The 1957–58 Sussex County Football League season was the 33nd in the history of the competition.

Division 1 remained at sixteen teams and Rye United was promoted from Division 2. Division 2 also remained at fifteen teams from which the winner would be promoted into Division 1.

Division One
The division featured 16 clubs, 15 which competed in the last season, along with one new club:
APV Athletic, promoted from last season's Division Two

League table

Division Two
The division featured 15 clubs, 13 which competed in the last season, along with two new clubs:
Lancing Athletic, relegated from last season's Division One and changed name to Lancing
Portslade

League table

References

1957-58
9